The HgcF RNA gene is a non-coding RNA identified computationally and experimentally verified in AT-rich hyperthermophiles. The genes were named hgcA through hgcG ("high GC"). It was later identified as Pab35 H/ACA snoRNA with rRNA targets.

See also 
HgcC family RNA
HgcE RNA
HgcG RNA
SscA RNA

References

External links 
 

Non-coding RNA